Ethnikos Asteras F.C. (the National Star) is a professional football club based in Kaisariani, Athens, Greece.

History
The club, originally named Ethnikos Astir, was founded in 1927 from the merger of Ethnikos and Asteras Kaisariani. They participated in the Greek first division from 1998 until 2002. Ethnikos Asteras is also known as Asteras FC a name related to the Warriors, Kaisariani's ultra supporters club.
The club's colors are red and white.

Former players

  Petros Marinakis

Notable coaches
  Nikos Alefantos
  Spyros Livathinos
  Armandos Leimanis

Football clubs in Attica
Association football clubs established in 1927
1927 establishments in Greece